The Sociological Review is a quarterly peer-reviewed academic journal covering all aspects of sociology, including anthropology, criminology, philosophy, education, gender, medicine, and organization. The journal is published by SAGE Publications; before 2017 it was published by Wiley-Blackwell. It is one of the three "main sociology journals in Britain", along with the British Journal of Sociology and Sociology, and the oldest British sociology journal.

The Sociological Review also publishes a monograph series that presents scholarly articles on issues of general sociological interest, and a themed monthly magazine that ″present[s] timely insights grounded in sociological thinking and [...] writing for a broad readership″.

History 
Established in 1908 as a successor of the Papers of the Sociological Society, its founder and first editor-in-chief was Leonard Trelawny Hobhouse. As the first professor of sociology in the United Kingdom, Hobhouse had a central role in establishing sociology as an academic discipline, and The Sociological Review became an important forum in this regard, and generally as a forum for new liberal theory of the early 20th century.

Editors

The following persons have been editors of this journal:
 Leonard Trelawny Hobhouse 1908–1910
 Samuel Kerkham Ratcliffe 1910–1917
 Victor Branford 1917–?
 Alexander Carr-Saunders, Alexander Farquharson, and Morris Ginsberg 1934–?

The current Editor-in-Chief of The Sociological Review Journal is Xiaodong (Wes) Lin.

Abstracting and indexing 
The Sociological Review is abstracted and indexed in the Social Sciences Citation Index. According to the Journal Citation Reports, the journal has a 2020 impact factor of 4.258.

References

External links 
 
 The Sociological Review Journal
 First volume at Internet Archive

Sociology journals
Publications established in 1908
English-language journals
1908 establishments in the United Kingdom
Quarterly journals
SAGE Publishing academic journals